Hale Upparahalli is a village in the southern state of Karnataka, India. It is located in the Gauribidanur taluk of Chikkaballapura district in Karnataka. It is situated 12 km away from sub-district headquarter Gauribidanur and 44 km away from district headquarter Chikkaballapura.

Demographics
According to Census 2011 information the location code or village code of Hale Upparahalli village is 623216.  Hale Upparahalli village belongs to Mudugere gram panchayat.

The total geographical area of village is 333.94 hectares. Hale Upparahalli has a total population of 1,227 peoples with 607 males and 620 females. There are about 321 houses in Hale Upparahalli village. Gauribidanur is nearest town to Hale Upparahalli  which is approximately 12 km away.

Economy
People belonging to the Hale Upparahalli village grow very much maize, millet silk, etc. The major occupations of the residents of Hale Upparahalli are sericulture and dairy farming. The dairy cooperative is the largest individual milk supplying cooperative in the state.

Facilities
Hale Upparahalli has below types of facilities.

 Government higher primary School
 Hale Upparahalli KMF (Karnataka Milk Federation) Dairy

Temples 
 Dharmamma Temple
 Lakshmi Narasimha Swamy Temple

References

External links

Villages in Chikkaballapur district